Laura Gail Thompson  (for a time with a married name Fairweather; born 4 June 1987) is a New Zealand cyclist and former basketballer. She represented New Zealand at the 2012 Summer Paralympics as the tandem sighted pilot for Phillipa Gray, winning three medals: one gold, one silver and one bronze. At the 2016 Summer Paralympics, she was the sighted pilot for Emma Foy, winning one silver and one bronze medal.

From 2014 to 2016 she won a total of eight medals (including three gold) at the UCI Para-cycling Track and Road Championships, with partner Emma Foy.

Thompson played basketball in her youth, representing New Zealand at junior level before being selected for the national team at age 18. However, she developed hip problems requiring surgery to correct and forcing her to retire from basketball. Thompson picked up cycling through rehabilitation, later becoming a member of the national development team before switching to para-cycling piloting in 2009.

In the 2013 New Year Honours, Fairweather was appointed a Member of the New Zealand Order of Merit for services to cycling. In the 2022 New Year Honours, Thompson was promoted to Officer of the New Zealand Order of Merit for services to Paralympic cycling.

References

External links
  (archive)
 

1987 births
Living people
New Zealand female cyclists
Paralympic sighted guides
Paralympic cyclists of New Zealand
Paralympic gold medalists for New Zealand
Paralympic silver medalists for New Zealand
Paralympic bronze medalists for New Zealand
Cyclists at the 2012 Summer Paralympics
Sportspeople from Southland, New Zealand
Officers of the New Zealand Order of Merit
Cyclists at the 2016 Summer Paralympics
Medalists at the 2012 Summer Paralympics
Medalists at the 2016 Summer Paralympics
Paralympic medalists in cycling